Diklosmta or simply Diklo (Chechen: Дукълуо-Лам, Duklo-Lam) is a peak in the eastern part of the Caucasus Mountains, located mostly in the Russian Republic of Chechnya, with some parts of the peak also located in Dagestan and the  Tusheti region of Georgia. The name Diklo(Дукълуо) derives from the Chechen language, and means "snowy peak".

Geography 
The mountain is located on the Pirikita Range which lies to the north of the Greater Caucasus Mountain Range. The mountain has several glaciers, some of which descend deep into the valleys of the Pirikita Range.

References 

Mountains of Georgia (country)
Georgia (country)–Russia border
International mountains of Europe
Mountains of Chechnya
Four-thousanders of the Caucasus
Mountains of Dagestan